This is a discography of American rock artist Alice Cooper. It includes 28 studio albums (plus two studio albums with Hollywood Vampires), 48 singles, 11 live albums, 21 compilation albums, 12 video releases, and an audiobook. Six of his studio albums have achieved platinum in the United States and three more have achieved gold. (Promo-only releases, bootlegs, and unauthorized/fan-made releases have been excluded here; individual songs and remixes are discussed in their own article.) The labels Cooper has recorded on are Straight, Warner Bros., Atlantic, MCA, Epic, Spitfire, Eagle, New West, and Bigger Picture. Over his career, Cooper has sold well over 50 million records.

Studio albums

Alice Cooper (band)

Solo career

Live albums

Extended play (EP) 
 Breadcrumbs (September 13, 2019)

Singles 

The Spiders: "Why Don't You Love Me/Hitch Hike" (Mascot M-112) 1965

The Spiders: "Don't Blow Your Mind/No Price Tag" 1966

Nazz: "Wonder Who's Loving Her Now?/Lay Down And Die, Goodbye" (Very Record S-001) 1967

With the Alice Cooper Group

Solo career

Compilations

DVD audio 
Billion Dollar Babies (Rhino, 2001)
Welcome to My Nightmare (Rhino, 2001)

Soundtracks 
Sgt. Pepper's Lonely Hearts Club Band
Roadie
Class of 1984
Friday the 13th Part VI: Jason Lives
Prince of Darkness
Iron Eagle II
Shocker
Wayne's World
Halloween
Scream
Dark Shadows
Dazed and Confused
Medicine Ball Caravan
The Decline Of Western Civilization Part II (The Metal Years)
Rock 'n' Roll High School

Other contributions

 "The Garden" by Guns N' Roses
 "Merry Arizona II: Desert Stars Shine at Christmas" (on "Is There a Santa?")
 "Intro" to "The Great Milenko" by Insane Clown Posse (1997 Island 524-442-2)
 "Flash Fearless Vs. the Zorg Women, Pts. 5 & 6" ("I'm Flash" and "Space Pirates")
 "Live at Wacken 2013" – includes live version of "Hey Stoopid" and "Billion Dollar Babies"
 "Savages" by Theory of a Deadman
 "The Toymaster" on The Scarecrow by Avantasia
 "Troubled Love" by Pushking
 "Hey Bulldog" on Butchering The Beatles
 "Eleanor Rigby" and "Smile Away" on The Art of McCartney
 "Shockdance" on Shocker Soundtrack - 1989 (as The Dudes of Wrath)
 "Be Chrool to Your Scuel" by Twisted Sister (1985)
 "Celebration Suite: Start Me Up, A Hard Day's Night, See Me, Feel Me/Listening to You", on CD British Rock Symphony
 "Baby Can't Drive" on Slash's self-titled solo album (2010)
 "Hallow's Grave" By Blue Coupe (2013)
 "Beginning of the End" on The New Normal by Kane Roberts (2019)
 "Heart Parade" by Splash'N Boots (2020)
 "Nobody Likes Us" (2012) (Reissue live album published by Easy Action independent label)

Audiobook (CD) 
Alice Cooper: Golf Monster (Abridged) (Random House Audio, May 1, 2007)
4CD audio version of Cooper's autobiography, narrated by Cooper.

Videography

Concert features and live footage

Others

References

Discography
Heavy metal group discographies
Discographies of American artists